Adl is a noble family of Iranian origin. The family was part of the Iranian oligarchy during the Pahlavi era and its members had significant roles in politics and diplomacy of Iran for more than seventy years.

Originally from Tabriz, the family descends from Hajj Seyyed Hossein (died circa 1840) also known as Hossein Shah, a wealthy merchant. His sons Seid Mirza Ebrahim Khalil and Mirza Hasan had received traditional religious training, but were enough enlightened to send their children abroad to receive modern education. Returning to Iran, they became pioneers in the modernization of the country. Mostafa Adl, son of Ebrahim Khalil, drafted the first civil code, while his cousin Yahya Adl became the first to practice modern surgery. Habib Adl was notable for importing cutting edge medical technologies, including X-ray medical imaging and Ahmad-Hossein Adl played a pivotal role in the establishment of modern industrial agriculture. The family came into prominence after the Iranian constitutional revolution, when the old aristocratic families were losing their inherited positions and were being replaced by a new generation of technocrats. The family further consolidated its position by several marriages to the old affluent families, including Vali, Hedayat, Farzaneh, Mahdavi, Boushehri, and Qajar nobility, including Farmanfarmaian family.

The origin of the modern family name 'Adl is from the titles of nobility given to Iranian jurists at the end of the 19th century, that were related by family ties. Notably, these jurists included Hajj Mirza Hasan whose title was Adl-ol-molk (Justice of the Kingdom), Seid Mirza Ebrahim Khalil whose title was Rokn-ol-edaleh (Pillar of Justice), and Mirza Mostafa Khan Adle whose title was Mansoor-ol-saltaneh (the Victorious of the Empire).

Notable family members
 Mostafa Adl, entitled Mansoor-ol-saltaneh 
 Ahmad-Hossein Adl
 Yahya Adl
Mahmoud Adl

See also
 Adl, an Arabic word which refers to God's divine justice

References

Sources
 

Adl family
Persian-language surnames